The 30th Anniversary Coca-Cola Twelve Hours of Sebring Camel GT, was the second round of the 1982 IMSA GT Championship and was held at the Sebring International Raceway, on March 20, 1982. Victory overall went to the No. 18 JLP Racing Porsche 935 driven by John Paul Sr. and John Paul Jr.

Race results
Class winners in bold.

Statistics
Pole Position: 2:27.067 - Bobby Rahal (#46 March 82G-Chevrolet)
Fastest Lap: 2:34.490 - John Fitzpatrick (#2 Porsche 935 K3/80)

Class Winners

References

12 Hours of Sebring
12 Hours of Sebring
12 Hours Of Sebring
12 Hours Of Sebring